Gemma Acheampong (born February 13, 1993) is a Ghanaian-American athlete specialising in the sprinting events. She holds the Ghanaian record in the rarely-contested indoor 300 meters event, and represented Ghana in the 4 × 100 metres relay at the 2016 Summer Olympics in Rio de Janeiro.

Competition record

Personal bests
Outdoor
100 metres – 11.43 (+0.2 m/s) (Cape Coast 2016)
200 metres – 24.21 (+1.2 m/s) (Princeton 2014)
Indoor
60 metres – 7.18 (Annapolis 2015)
200 metres – 24.41 (Boston 2015)
300 metres – 39.50 (Boston 2015)

References

External links
 
 
 
 
 

1993 births
Living people
Sportspeople from Waterbury, Connecticut
Track and field athletes from Chicago
Ghanaian female sprinters
American female sprinters
Olympic female sprinters
Olympic athletes of Ghana
Athletes (track and field) at the 2016 Summer Olympics
Commonwealth Games competitors for Ghana
Athletes (track and field) at the 2014 Commonwealth Games
Athletes (track and field) at the 2018 Commonwealth Games
African Games silver medalists for Ghana
African Games medalists in athletics (track and field)
Athletes (track and field) at the 2015 African Games
Athletes (track and field) at the 2019 African Games
21st-century American women